"Rien ne me changera" is the second single from the winner of A La Recherche De La Nouvelle Star -  Jonatan Cerrada. In English "Rien ne me Changera" means "Nothing Will Change Me". This song features on Jonatan's debut album Siempre 23.

Track listing
 CD single
 "Rien ne me changera" — 3:32
 "Rien ne me changera" (video)
 "Je voulais te dire que je t'attends" (video)

Charts

References

2003 singles
Jonatan Cerrada songs
2003 songs
RCA Records singles